Santa Cruz del Islote (Spanish for: Santa Cruz of the Islet or Holy Cross of the Islet) is an artificial island located off the coast of Bolívar Department in Colombia, close to Tolu and Coveñas. It is a part of the Archipelago of San Bernardo. Its large population for its size has given it notoriety for supposedly being the most densely populated island on earth; however, estimates of its population vary greatly.

History
The islet is partially of artificial origin, built by local fishermen who used coral, debris, stone, and other materials to build up the land at low tide. According to legend, the settlers were attracted to the island not only for its abundance of fish but also because there were no mosquitoes living on it. It is believed that this reclamation dates from around 1870. Due to its small size, some locals would later migrate to neighboring islets such as Tintipán Island or Mucura Island.

In 2013 a community council was formed by the residents to discuss local problems. The island and some residences were affected by flooding due to a tidal wave in 2018.

At an event held in August 2020, attended by the Minister of Technology (ICT) of the Government of Colombia and the Governor of the Department of Bolívar, a free 24-hour Internet service called Zona Digital Rural was established for the island, allowing the residents access to distance education in the midst of the coronavirus pandemic. Previously, service had been expensive and of poor quality, making it difficult to carry out administrative and educational activities from home.

On 2 July 2021 the island became the first territory in Colombia to be fully vaccinated against the COVID-19 virus.

Geography
The island has an area of 12,140.57 m2, or almost 1.214057 hectares.

Demographics
The population of the island is contested, and the frequently cited figure of 1,247 is likely to be an exaggeration. A census taken in the mid-2010s fixed the population at 492. Another source provides a figure of 779 for the corregimiento of Santa Cruz, which is said to be coterminous with the island.

Government and politics
Due to its small size, the territory is not autonomous. Geographically it is part of the San Bernardo Archipelago in the Department of Bolívar in northern Colombia and is guarded by the Colombian Navy.

See also
 Caribbean region of Colombia
 Insular region of Colombia
 List of islands of South America
 List of islands by population density

References

External links

Santa Cruz del Islote

The magical realism of Santa Cruz del Islote - photo essay (The Guardian)

Caribbean islands of Colombia
Bolívar Department